St. Paul Education Regional Division No. 1 or St. Paul Education is a public school authority within the Canadian province of Alberta operated out of St. Paul.

See also 
List of school authorities in Alberta

References

External links 

School districts in Alberta
County of St. Paul No. 19